Shelley Jean Newman, now Parr and (née Drew), (born 8 August 1973) is a female retired English discus thrower. She was born in Carshalton, London and competed for Great Britain at the 2004 Summer Olympics.

Athletics career
Her personal best throw is 61.22 metres, achieved in June 2003 in Loughborough. This was the English record for many years and at the time and placed her fourth on the British outdoor all-time list, behind Meg Ritchie, Venissa Head and Philippa Roles. She represented England in the discus event, at the 1998 Commonwealth Games in Kuala Lumpur, Malaysia. Four years later she won a bronze medal at the 2002 Commonwealth Games in Manchester.

Personal life
Shelley has a degree in physiology, which she gained at the University of Birmingham in 1994. She earned her doctorate in the subject in 1999 and became a Professorial Fellow in Medical Education in 2016. She currently works as the Director of the Centre for Higher Education Practice at the University of Southampton.  Previously she held posts at the University of Birmingham and, until 2007, Cardiff University.

International competitions

References
 

1973 births
Living people
Athletes from London
People from Carshalton
British female discus throwers
English female discus throwers
Olympic athletes of Great Britain
Athletes (track and field) at the 2004 Summer Olympics
Commonwealth Games bronze medallists for England
Commonwealth Games medallists in athletics
Athletes (track and field) at the 1998 Commonwealth Games
Athletes (track and field) at the 2002 Commonwealth Games
World Athletics Championships athletes for Great Britain
Alumni of the University of Birmingham
Competitors at the 1999 Summer Universiade
Medallists at the 2002 Commonwealth Games